Charles Barrington may refer to:

Charles Barrington (mountaineer), (1834–1901), Irish mountaineer
Sir Charles Barrington, 5th Baronet ( 1671–1715), English MP and Vice-Admiral of Essex
Sir Charles Burton Barrington, 5th Baronet (1848–1943) of the Barrington baronets of Limerick
Sir Charles Bacon Barrington, 6th Baronet (1902–1980) of the Barrington baronets of Limerick

See also
Charles Barrington Balfour (1862–1921), British army officer and politician